Asianfanfics.com (often abbreviated as AFF) is an automated fan fiction archive site. It was founded in  2009 by Jason Ado, also known as Nichiren.

The site revolves around Asian fanfiction. Users who complete the free registration process can submit their fan fiction, maintain a user profile, review other stories, contact each other via private messages, and subscribe to stories, tags and authors. Asianfanfics is one of the only websites which does not require an email registration.

Creation 
In 2008, Ado created Asianfanfics as a favor to his girlfriend, who happened to be sick and was frustrated because another website kept deleting her stories. The website userbase increased, and he wanted to maintain the community that was built around this site. Ado says he will keep Asianfanfics going to remember his girlfriend, who died a year later.

Site content 
Writers may upload their stories to the site and add tags to them like M-rated, trigger warning, completed, friends only, members only or subscribers only. There is a separate M-Rated Section that can be found at the top of the page if signed in.  The site does not pay money to people for posting content or charge money for posting on the website, and it uses advertisements and AFF Gold User to pay for costs.

The stories are based on Asian books, television series, films, video games, dramas or bands. Stories are about recent works and older works.

Majority of the fanfiction is about K-pop singers, a Korean music genre.

Globalization 
The creator of Asianfanfics, Jason Ado, is from America, but users of the website come from a huge variety of countries, including Australia, Malaysia, America, and Cambodia.

Although majority of the fanfiction is in English, you can also write in other languages.

FanficOverflow.com and RoleplayRepublic.com 
Asianfanfics.com's sister sites, Fanficoverflow.com (FFO) and Roleplayrepublic.com (RPR), though less popular than asianfanfics, are also home to many fanfictions that are not Asian-related, and roleplays.

There is a strict no K-pop rule in Fanficoverflow.com, as many fans have been advertising their story from AFF to FFO.

See also 
 Wattpad, another website
 Archive of Our Own (Organization for Transformative Works), another website

References 

Computer-related introductions in 2009
Ebook sources
Fan fiction
Internet properties established in 2009